The 2013 Finnish League Cup will be the 17th season of the Finnish League Cup, Finland's second-most prestigious cup football tournament. TPS are the defending champions, having won their first league cup last year.

The cup consists of two stages. First there will be a group stage that involves the 12 Veikkausliiga teams divided into three groups. The top two teams and two best 3rd placed teams from each group will enter the one-legged elimination rounds – quarter-finals, semi-finals and the final.

Group stage
Every team will play every other team of its group twice, both home and away. The group stage matches will be played from 15 January to 6 March 2012.

Group 1

Group 2

Group 3

Ranking of third-placed teams

Knockout stage

Quarter-finals

Semi-finals

Final

References

Finnish League Cup
League Cup
Finnish League Cup